My Way is the debut album by former The Delfonics vocalist Major Harris. Released in 1975 and recorded at Sigma Sound Studios, Harris scored a hit in the United States with the single "Love Won't Let Me Wait". The single hit number five on the pop chart and number one on the soul chart for one week. It was awarded a gold disc by the RIAA. on June 25, 1975.

Track listing

Personnel
Major Harris - lead and backing Vocals
Barbara Ingram, Carla Benton, Evette Benson - backing vocals
Bobby Eli, Norman Harris - guitar
Bob Babbitt, Ronnie Baker, Rusty Jackmon - bass
Charles Collins, Earl Young - drums
Ron "Have Mercy" Kersey - keyboards
Larry Washington - congas
Vince Montana - vibraphone
Don Renaldo & His Strings & Horns - strings, horns
Technical
Alan Rubens, Bruce Gable, Steve Bernstein - co-producers
Carl Paruolo, Don Murray, Jay Mark, Kenny Present - recording engineer

Charts

Singles

References

External links
 Major Harris-My Way at Discogs

1975 debut albums
Atlantic Records albums
Albums recorded at Sigma Sound Studios